Pecel (Javanese:ꦥꦼꦕꦼꦭ꧀) is a traditional Javanese salad with peanut sauce, usually eaten with carbs (steamed rice, lontong or ketupat).

The simplicity of pecel preparation and its cheap price have contributed to its popularity throughout Java. It has become a food that represents practicality, simplicity, and travel, since the dish is often found along the train journey across Java.

Pecel was introduced to Malaysia, where it is known as pecal, by Javanese immigrants. Pecel is also very popular in Suriname, where it was introduced by the Javanese Surinamese.

History

In Babad Tanah Jawi (circa 17th century), Ki Gede Pemanahan referred to the dish he presented to his guest, Sunan Kalijaga as "pecel-ized boiled vegetables". In Javanese language, "pecel" used to refer to the act of squeezing the water out of something. 

Sunan Kalijaga was not familiar with the dish as he came from northeastern part of Central Java, while the dish was native to Yogyakarta. This dish became one of the most popular Javanese dishes soon after it was introduced to other regions of Java, and the word pecel took its current meaning, "a side dish that is made of vegetables and sauce".

Pecel is only one of many Javanese vegetable-based salads. It is similar to lothek, except that lothek is usually served with fried batter or tofu and uses both raw and cooked vegetables.

Ingredients

Main ingredients usually consist of leafy vegetables, bean sprouts (or any other plant sprouts), long beans, and cabbages. Some other types of vegetables can also be added. People may use amaranth leaves, kangkung, cassava leaves, or leaves or any other local plants that are in season. Some modern recipes will add carrots (sliced) into the mix, or replace white cabbages with the red ones to spice up the color. 

The sauce is made of roasted (or fried) peanut, asam jawa, coconut sugar, and other spices. It might be served thick or watery, sweet or spicy, depending on the regional variation. 

Pecel is usually eaten with rice or rice cake (lontong or kupat). It can also be eaten alone or with fried side dishes, such as, fried tempeh, tofu, etc.; and Javanese crackers, such as krupuk or rempeyek.

Variants

The difference usually lies on the thickness level of the sauce, the taste profiles (spicy, sweet, or savory). In Central Java, pecel sauce is sweet-savory with medium thickness, except in northern coast and north-eastern regions where the sauce tends to be more spicy and the sauce is usually a bit thinner than usual. In East Java, especially Madiun, the peanut sauce is very thin and spicy. Lamtoro seeds are often added as a topping. 

In Tegal, Central Java, pecel sauce is made of peanut and cassava root. In Surakarta's pecel ndeso, black sesame sauce is used on top of peanut sauce.

In Yogyakarta, pecel is served with bacem (sweet-simmered) tempeh or tofu. In Surakarta, a pecel variant called lothek (alt. spelling: lotek) includes the use of some raw vegetables, lontong, and gorengan. The name "lothek" is derived from "luthik", a wooden spatula used to scoop the peanut sauce from a cowek (grinding bowl).

Mie pecel or pecel mie, a noodle with pecel sauce is common in Central Java as well as Medan. One of them is pecel mie kenyol from Batang, the noodle made from cassava with a chewy texture.

Gallery

See also

 Karedok
 Tipat cantok
 Ketoprak
 Lawar
 List of salads
 Pecel lele
 Urap

References

Malaysian cuisine
Javanese cuisine
Sauces
Vegetarian dishes of Indonesia
Vegetable dishes of Indonesia
Street food in Indonesia